Castelnuovo Berardenga is a comune (municipality) in the province of Siena in the Italian region Tuscany, located about  southeast of Florence and about  east of Siena. Since 1932 it has been included in the Chianti wine-production area.

The Battle of Montaperti between Guelphs and Ghibellines was fought nearby on 4 September 1260.

The territory of Castelnuovo Berardenga borders that of the comuni of Asciano, Bucine, Castellina in Chianti, Gaiole in Chianti, Monteriggioni, Radda in Chianti, Rapolano Terme and Siena.

Villages and hamlets
The comune of Castelnuovo Berardenga includes the frazioni of: 
 
 Casetta
 Monteaperti
 Pianella
 Pievasciata
 Ponte a Bozzone
 Quercegrossa
 San Giovanni a Cerreto
 San Gusmè
 Vagliagli and Villa a Sesta

And the hamlets or smaller villages of: 
 
 Abbazia Monastero
 Barca
 Bivio Santo Stefano
 Bossi
 Campi
 Castell'In Villa
 Castelnuovo Scalo
 Catignano
 Chieci
 Cignano
 Colonna del Grillo
 Corsignano
 Curina
 Geggiano
 Guistrigona
 La Ripa
 Monaciano
 Monastero d'Ombrone
 Pacina
 Petroio
 Poggiarello-La Ripa
 Pontignanello
 Pontignano
 Rosennano
 San Felice
 San Giovanni
 San Piero
 San Vito
 Santa Chiara
 Santa Margherita-La Suvera
 Santa Maria a Dofana
 Sestano
 Stellino
 Villa d'Arceno
 Vitignano

Main sights
 Castello di Montalto

Villas
 Villa Arceno
 Villa di Catignano o Villa Sergardi
 Villa Chigi Lucarini Saracini
 Villa di Geggiano or Villa Bianchi-Bandinelli
 Villa di Monaciano
 Villa Pagliaia
 Villa di Sestano
 Villa di Fagnano or Villa Terrosi Vagnoli

Churches
 Propositura dei Santi Giusto e Clemente
 Pieve di Santa Maria a Pàcina
 Pieve di San Felice a Bossi
 Pieve dei Santi Cosma e Damiano (San Gusmè)
 Pieve di San Giovanni Battista (Pieve Asciata)
 Pieve di Santa Maria (Villa a Sesta)
 Chiesa di San Cristoforo a Vagliagli
 Chiesa di San Pietro (Canonica a Cerreto)
 Chiesa di Sant'Ansano a Dofàna
 Chiesa dei Santi Giacomo e Niccolò (Quercegrossa)
 Chiesa di San Giovanni Evangelista (Cerreto)
 Chiesa di San Bartolomeo (Sestano)
 Cappella di San Giovanni (Villa di Arceno)
 Cappella di Santa Croce (Villa Sergardi di Catignano)
 Cappella della Madonna del Rosario (Villa Bianchi-Bandinelli)
 Certosa di Pontignano (Certosa di San Pietro)
 Monastery of San Salvatore (Badia Monastero)

References